Artyukhovka is a rural locality and the administrative center of Artyukhovsky Selsoviet Rural Settlement, Oktyabrsky District, Kursk Oblast, Russia. Population:

Geography 
The village is located on the Dichnya River (a left tributary of the Seym River), 57 km from the Russia–Ukraine border, 31 km south-west of Kursk, 14 km south-west of the district center – the urban-type settlement Pryamitsyno.

 Climate
Artyukhovka has a warm-summer humid continental climate (Dfb in the Köppen climate classification).

Transport 
Artyukhovka is located 21 km from the federal route  Crimea Highway (a part of the European route ), on the road of regional importance  ("Crimea Highway" – Ivanino, part of the European route ) and on the road of intermunicipal significance  (38K-010 – Artyukhovka), 9.5 km from the nearest railway halt 433 km (railway line Lgov I — Kursk).

The rural locality is situated 42 km from Kursk Vostochny Airport, 116 km from Belgorod International Airport and 241 km from Voronezh Peter the Great Airport.

References

Notes

Sources

Rural localities in Oktyabrsky District, Kursk Oblast